The Tower of Roccapina is a ruined Genoese tower located in the commune of Sartène (Corse-du-Sud) on the southwest coast of the Corsica.

The construction of the tower was begun in 1609. It was one of a series of coastal defences built by the Republic of Genoa between 1530 and 1620 to stem the attacks by Barbary pirates. In 1994 the tower was listed as one of the official historical monuments of France.

The Conservatoire du littoral, a French government agency responsible for the protection of outstanding natural areas on the coast, has purchased  of the Punta di u Capicciolu headland and the adjacent coastline.

See also
List of Genoese towers in Corsica

References

External links
 Includes information on how to reach 90 towers and many photographs.

Towers in Corsica
Monuments historiques of Corsica